Coats Group plc is a British multi-national company.  It is the world's largest manufacturer and distributor of sewing thread and supplies, and the second-largest manufacturer of zips and fasteners, after YKK.  It is listed on the London Stock Exchange and is a constituent of the FTSE 250 Index.

History

In 1755 James and Patrick Clark began a loom equipment and silk thread business in Paisley, Scotland. In 1806 Patrick Clark invented a way of twisting cotton together to substitute for silk that was unavailable due to the French blockade of Great Britain. He opened the first plant for manufacturing the cotton thread in 1812. In 1864 the Clark family began manufacturing in Newark, New Jersey, U.S., as the Clark Thread Co.

In 1802 James Coats set up a weaving business, also in Paisley. In 1826 he opened a cotton mill at Ferguslie to produce his own thread and, when he retired in 1830, his sons, James & Peter, took up the business under the name of J. & P. Coats. The firm expanded internationally, particularly to the United States. In 1890 Coats listed on the London Stock Exchange, with capital of £5.7 million. In 1896 J. and P. Coats acquired controlling interests in the firms of  Clark and Co, Jonas Brook and Brothers and James Chadwick and Brother.

In 1952 J. & P. Coats and the Clark Thread Co. merged to become Coats & Clark's. In 1961 a merger with Patons and Baldwins created Coats Patons. In 1986 a merger with Vantona Viyella created Coats Viyella. In 2003 Guinness Peat took Coats private and in 2015 the business returned to the market as "Coats Group".

Controversy

In 2007 Coats was fined €110 million by the European Commission for participation in cartels with Prym, YKK and other companies to fix and manipulate the prices of zips and other fasteners, and of the machinery to make them.  One of the cartels ran for twenty-one years. An appeal in 2012 to the General Court of the European Union was dismissed, and the fine upheld.

References

Further reading

External links

 
 
 

1755 establishments in England
1755 establishments in Scotland
British companies established in 1755
Companies based in the London Borough of Hillingdon
Companies listed on the London Stock Exchange
Manufacturing companies established in 1755
Manufacturing companies of Scotland
Privately held companies of the United Kingdom
Scottish brands
Textile manufacturers of Scotland